Henry Carroll (1772 – 29 February 1820) was a Colonial lawyer and who served as secretary to Henry Clay, Congressman and a member of the Treaty of Ghent Peace Commission.

Early and family life
Henry Carroll was the eldest of eight children of Charles Carroll of Bellevue (1767-1823) and his wife, the former Ann Sprigg (1769-1837). The Carroll family was one of the most powerful in Maryland, descended from Charles Carroll the Settler (1660-1720), the great-grandfather of Charles Carroll of Duddington (1764-1849), this man's grandfather. Although his great grandfather, Daniel Carroll of Duddington (1707-1734) owned the land that eventually became Capitol Hill in the District of Columbia, by this time the family operated plantations near Hagerstown in Washington County, Maryland. His brother Charles H. Carroll (1794-1865) would become a prominent politician in New York, and U.S. Congressman. Another brother, William Thomas Carroll (1831-1863) served as the 5th Clerk of the United States Supreme Court, and their sister Elizabeth Barbara Carroll (1806-1866) married Henry Fitzhugh who also became a politician in New York.

Other early distinguished members of the Carroll family were descended from Charles the settler's elder son, Charles Carroll of Annapolis, including Charles Carroll the Barrister, and Charles Carroll of Carrollton who signed the Declaration of Independence for the Colony of Maryland in 1776.

Carroll of Bellevue and Dumbarton House
In 1814, Charles Carroll of Bellevue was proprietor of the Dumbarton House which offered a contingency plan for Dolley Madison during the August 23, 1814, flight from the White House prior to the onslaught of the British Army redcoats and the Burning of Washington.

Diplomatic Service and Treaty of Ghent

From August 1814 to December 24, 1814, Henry Carroll accompanied a peace commission from Colonial America to Ghent, Belgium for negotiations concerning the Treaty of Ghent seeking a cessation to the War of 1812. Henry was appointed courier for the delivery of the peace treaty to James Madison for ratification by Colonial America. On January 2, 1815, Anthony St. John Baker and Henry Carroll embarked the British sloop ship HMS Favorite in London sailing under a flag of truce to Colonial America with a distant anchoring at Sandy Hook peninsula on February 11, 1815. After his arrival in Lower New York Bay, Henry boarded a post chaise granting an arrival in Washington City on February 14, 1815. The treaty was delivered to President Madison at a temporary Executive Mansion better known as The Octagon House. President Madison presented the Treaty of Ghent to the United States Senate on February 16, 1815, where the peace treaty was unanimously approved ending British impressment and the War of 1812.

Assassination of Henry Carroll
In 1820, Henry Carroll resided in the Missouri Territory near Franklin, Missouri, serving as a federal registrar of public lands for the organized territory concurrently to the Missouri Compromise. Henry had a dispute with Richard Gentry concerning his governance of land patents and territorial revenue where his life expired on Tuesday, February 29, 1820.

See also

Colonial America Peace Treaty Commission at Ghent, United Netherlands

Grievances and Origins of the War of 1812

References

Presidential Letters of Henry Carroll

Reading Bibliography

External links
 
 
 
 
 
 

1772 births
1820 deaths
American people of the War of 1812
Carroll family